The World Today is the thirteenth studio album by Australian country music artist Troy Cassar-Daley. The album was released on 19 March 2021 and peaked at number 3 on the ARIA Charts.

At the 2021 ARIA Music Awards, the album won Best Country Album.

At the 2022 Country Music Awards of Australia, the album won Top Selling Album of the Year.

Reception

Mallory Arbour from Country Town said "In short, The World Today is a good example of an artist staying true to himself while pushing the boundaries. Rather than a change, the album is a progression for Troy Cassar-Daley that needs repeat listening to be fully appreciated."

Jeff Jenkins from Stack Magazine said "Cassar-Daley is one of our biggest country stars, but he has broadened his sound. The World Today – which features co-writes with Paul Kelly, Don Walker, Shane Howard, Ian Moss and Kevin Bennett – owes as much to the bluesy working-class rock of Springsteen and Chisel as it does traditional country.."

Tyler Jenke from Rolling Stone Australia called the album "one of the most confronting records in his discography, but easily one of the most breathtaking. Equally personal and resounding, Cassar-Daley crafts an almost flawless collection of songs within the space of an hour, touching upon topics which range from the introspective to the quietly exuberant, while providing an overarching feeling of positivity to the darkness."

Track listing

Charts

Weekly charts

Year-end charts

Release history

References

2021 albums
ARIA Award-winning albums
Sony Music Australia albums
Troy Cassar-Daley albums